Camille Intson, also known professionally as Camie, is a Canadian playwright, singer-songwriter, new media artist, and researcher.

Personal life and education 

Intson was born in February 1997 in Hamilton, Ontario, and was raised in Dundas, Ontario. She attended Westdale Secondary School and is an alum of the University of Western Ontario and the Royal Central School of Speech and Drama. Intson is currently pursuing her PhD at the University of Toronto Faculty of Information and resides between Toronto and Hamilton. She identifies as queer and uses she/her pronouns.

Playwriting and performance 

Intson's plays frequently touch on themes of queer female identity, sexuality, and intimacy, and the impact of emerging technologies on human relationships, often pandering to new generation performers and audiences.

Her works have been awarded various honours, including a 2021 Tom Hendry Award (issued by the Playwrights Guild of Canada) for We All Got Lost, which also won the Best in Fringe, Best in Venue, and New Play Contest prizes at the 2019 Hamilton fringe theatre festival. Her short play Road was the inaugural winner of the Newmarket National 10 Minute Play Festival in 2017, and she was also the recipient of the 2018 Lillian Kroll Prize in Creative Writing (issued by the University of Western Ontario) for Marty and Joel and the Edge of Chaos. Intson was also shortlisted for the 2021 New Media Writing Prize's "Opening Up" Award for her online digital media work, betweenspace. As of late 2021, Intson is an artist-in-residence at Tarragon Theatre, where she is developing her new play, JANE.

Intson is the Artistic Director of Pantheon Projects, a Toronto and Hamilton-based queer and feminist intermedial performance and new media collective. The collective is mandated to create "research-based performance work that foregrounds the integration of emerging technologies into live performance, using transmedial methods of storytelling to create distinctly queer and feminist aesthetic experiences for new generation audiences."

Music 

Intson frequently performs original music as a singer-songwriter under the pseudonym Camie. In October 2022, Intson received the Colleen Peterson Songwriting Award for her song "Winter", and was nominated for a 2023 Canadian Folk Music Award for her 2021 EP, "troubadour". She was also the winner of a 2016 Hamilton Music Award in the "Rising Star" category.

Intson considers herself of the "alternative folk" genre, which she has described as "traditional folk stylings imbued with contemporary synth and string textures". She often collaborates with Toronto-based producer and multi-instrumentalist, Mike Tompa.

Plays 
 JANE.
 Patchface
 We All Got Lost
 The Last 48 (created with Rafaella Rosenberg)
 Road.
 The Stock
 Marty and Joel and the Edge of Chaos

Discography 
 Winter (2021, Single)
 Troubadour (2021, EP)
 Renegade (acoustic) (2019, LP)
 Sharp Teeth (2019, LP)
 Songs From Worlds Past (2018, EP)

References 

1997 births
Living people